Miss Fisher's Murder Mysteries is an Australian mystery drama created by Deb Cox and Fiona Eagger. The series is based on Kerry Greenwood's Phryne Fisher Murder Mystery novels. It premiered on ABC, a public television network, on 24 February 2012 with the pilot episode "Cocaine Blues". Miss Fisher's Murder Mysteries focuses on the personal and professional life of Phryne Fisher (Essie Davis), a private detective in late 1920s Melbourne. The first season, set in 1928, consisted of thirteen episodes and the second season was also thirteen episodes long, including a Christmas special. A third series, consisting of eight episodes, was commissioned in June 2014 and began airing from 8 May 2015. This show was rated a 69/100 on IGN.

Series overview

Episodes

Series 1 (2012)

Series 2 (2013)
Miss Fisher's Murder Mysteries was renewed by the ABC for a second series on 26 July 2012. The second series is based on Greenwood's novels Dead Man's Chest, Unnatural Habits and various short stories. Cox commented that she and Eagger were "thrilled" that many of the cast and crew from the first series were returning.

Series 3 (2015)

References

External links
 

Lists of Australian drama television series episodes